Epipsestis nigropunctata is a moth in the family Drepanidae. It is found in China, Japan (Hokkaido, Honshu, Shikoku), Korea, the Russian Far East and Nepal.

The larvae feed on Quercus mongolica.

Subspecies
Epipsestis nigropunctata nigropunctata (Nepal, China: Yunnan)
Epipsestis nigropunctata perornata Inoue, 1972 (south-eastern Russia, Japan, Korean Peninsula, China: Shaanxi)

References

Moths described in 1941
Thyatirinae
Moths of Asia